Cayetano Descalzi (or Gaetano Descalzi) (1809–1886) was an Italian painter and engraver who came to the Río de la Plata, now Argentina, in the 1820s. 

In 1830, Descalzi married Juliana Miró, the widowed mother of Carlos Morel, who was also to become a celebrated artist.
They legally separated eight years later.

Descalzi is recognized for his oil lithograph of Governor Juan Manuel de Rosas, made in 1841, entitled "Rosas, el Grande", printed the following year by Lemercier of París. 
He also made the portrait of the magistrate Don Tomas Giráldez in Quilmes.
One of his pupils was Cándido López (1840-1902).

Gallery

References
Citations

Sources

1809 births
1886 deaths
Italian emigrants to Argentina
Argentine engravers
Argentine portrait painters
19th-century Argentine painters
19th-century Argentine male artists
Argentine male painters